The University of New Mexico–Los Alamos (UNM-LA) is a branch campus of the public University of New Mexico and located in Los Alamos, New Mexico. UNM-LA offers 14 certificate programs and 18 associate degree programs.  In addition, UNM-LA offers a Dual Credit program, which allows high school students to take college classes, an adult basic education program for students seeking their New Mexico High School Equivalency Credential (the General Education Development (GED) or  HiSet), and an ESL (English as a Second Language) program. Students often work part-time at Los Alamos National Laboratory.

Campus
UNM-LA is located in central Los Alamos.

References

External links
Official website

Los Alamos
Public universities and colleges in New Mexico
Los Alamos, New Mexico
Buildings and structures in Los Alamos County, New Mexico
Education in Los Alamos County, New Mexico
Educational institutions established in 1980
1980 establishments in New Mexico